Nicola Fanucchi, (born 29 December 1964 in Lucca) is an Italian stage actor and director.

Life and career 
Fanucchi has appeared on stage since he was a child.

In 2000 he made his debut as a professional in productions for the Teatro del Giglio in Lucca, directing "Histoire du Soldat" and in 2001 a melodrama "Enoch Arden", in which he also starred. Since then he has alternated acting and directing at various Italian theaters.

In 2011 he began his collaboration with the Peccioli Teatro company directed by Andrea Buscemi, with whom he performed in theatrical tours in co-starring roles. From 2017 he began a collaboration with the Fondazione Sipario Toscana onlus for children.

For the Geneva Chamber Opera, in 2019 he co-directed with Cataldo Russo, “Così fan tutte”, and in 2021, again with Cataldo Russo, co-directed “Don Pasquale” by Gaetano Donizetti.

Theater 

 2000 “Histoire du soldat” by Charles Ferdinand Ramuz (director and actor), conductor Stefano Addabbo
 2001 "Enoch Arden" by Alfred Tennysson (director and actor) with Eros Pagni
 2005 "Platero y yo" by Juan Ramon Jimenez (actor) with Saverio Rapezzi
 2008 "Pierrot Lunaire" by Arnold Shoenberg (actor), conductor Mario Ancillotti
 2011 "Veianio" by Giovanni Pascoli (actor), Ensemble Nuovo Contrappunto conductor Mario Ancillotti with Maddalena Crippa
 2011 "Miriam" from ":it:In nome della madre" by Erri De Luca (director)
 2012 "Ottonovecento strumentale italiano" (actor) with Mario Ancillotti, Simone Soldati, Susanna Rigacci
 2012 "The merchant of Venice" by William Shakespeare (actor), director Andrea Buscemi
 2013 "L'avare" by Molière (actor), director Andrea Buscemi
 2014 "La Mandragola" by Niccolò Machiavelli (actor), director Andrea Buscemi
 2014 "Il malato immaginario" by Molière (actor) dicrector Andrea Buscemi
 2016 "Sciailoc" from "The merchant of Venice" by William Shakespeare (director)
 2017 "Secondo Marco" by Nicola Fanucchi (playwright, director and actor) with Piero Perelli
 2017 "Abbasso i bulli" by Francesco Tammacco (director)
 2018 "Linda e un sacco di cose da fare" by Livia Castellana (director)
 2018 "Mafalda e il suo cagnolino" by Martina Benedetti (director)
 2018 "Faber per Tenco" by Fabrizio De André and Luigi Tenco (director)
 2018 "Pasolini lives" by Antonio Pavolini (director and actor)
2018 "Processo a Francesco Burlamacchi" by Riccardo Nencini (director)
 2019 "L'allenatore e la ballerina" by Erno Erbstein and Susanna Egri(playwright and director)
 2019 "Macerie" by Domenico Sartori (director)
 2019 "Bauhaus" by Nicola Fanucchi (playwright and director)
 2021 "La scelta" by Antonio Pavolini (director and actor)
 2022 "Peer Gynt" by Henrik Ibsen - music by Edvard Grieg.  Orchestra Nuove Assonanze directed by Svilen Simeonov (actor)
 2022 "WAW We are women" by Nicola Fanucchi (aplaywright and director)

Opera 

 2002 "Le nozze di Figaro" by Wolfgang Amadeus Mozart (director), conductor Stefano Adabbo
 2003 "La serva padrona" by Battista Pergolesi (director), conductor Stefano Adabbo
 2003 "La voix humaine" by Jean Cocteau (director), conductor Stefano Adabbo
 2005 "Il segreto di Susanna" by Ermanno Wolf Ferrari (director), conductor Stefano Adabbo
 2017 "Carmen" by Bizet (assistant director), conductor Mario Menicagli
 2017 "Turandot" by Giacomo Puccini (assistant director), Beseto Opera Seoul, conductor Franco Trinca with Walter Fraccaro, Irina Vaschenko, Hye-Myung Kang
 2018 "Suor Angelica" by Giacomo Puccini (director), with Silvana Froli
 2018 "L'elisir d'amore" by Gaetano Donizetti (co-director), Scm Seoul, conductor Marco Boemi with Bianca Tognocchi
 2019 "Così fan tutte" by Wolfgang Amadeus Mozart (co-director), Opéra de chambre de Genève, conductor Franco Trinca
 2020 "De' relitti e delle quarantene" by Mario Menicagli (co-director), conductor Mario Menicagli
 2021 "Don Pasquale" by Gaetano Donizetti (co-director), Opéra de chambre de Genève conductor Franco Trinca
 2021 "La serva padrona" by Giovan Battista Pergolesi (director), conductor Stefano Teani 
 2022 "La cambiale di matrimonio" by Gioacchino Rossini (co-director), Opéra de chambre de Genève, conductor Franco Trinca
 2022 "Tosca, l'ora è fuggita" by Giacomo Puccini (director), Teatro del Giglio di Lucca, Quintetto Lucensis

Filmography 

 2006 – Salty air (actor), director Alessandro Angelini with Giorgio Pasotti
 2008 – Puccini (actor), director Mario Capitani with Alessio Boni
 2011 – Johnny T. (actor), director Tommaso Landucci with Alberto Paradossi
 2020 – Come pesci rossi sul divano (actor), director Cristina Puccinelli
 2020 – Pepsi's Saz O Surood. Ma Akhtar, Shabhaiman. (Music video stage director) with Mashal Arman

Awards and acknowledgments 

 1993 – Mecenate d’oro, "Best supporting actor award" in "Hello Dolly"
 1997 – Eurako, "Best actor in leading role award" in "Rumori fuori scena"
 1998 – Castello di Gorizia, "Best supporting actor award" in "Rumori fuori scena"
 2001 – Festival nazionale d'Arte Drammatica, "Best actor award" in "La lettera di mamma"
 2011 – Festival Nazionale Imperia, "Best actor award" in Nove mele per Eva"

Notes

References

External links 

 

1964 births
Living people
Italian male stage actors
Italian theatre directors
People from Tuscany
Actors from Lucca